Massachusetts House of Representatives' 13th Suffolk district in the United States is one of 160 legislative districts included in the lower house of the Massachusetts General Court. It covers part of Quincy in Norfolk County and part of Boston in Suffolk County. Democrat Dan Hunt of Dorchester has represented the district since 2014.

The current district geographic boundary overlaps with those of the Massachusetts Senate's Norfolk and Plymouth district and 1st Suffolk district.

Representatives
 John Bent, circa 1858-1859 
 Mellen Chamberlain, circa 1858-1859 
 Edward J. Leary, circa 1888 
 Thomas F. Sullivan, circa 1888 
 Frank J. Burke, circa 1920 
 Richard D. Gleason, 1923–1925
 Timothy J. Driscoll, circa 1920 
 Abraham Herbert Kahalas, circa 1951 
 Charles Kaplan, circa 1951 
 Wilfred S. Mirsky, circa 1951 
 Daniel W. Carney, 1963-1971 
 James J. Craven, Jr., circa 1975 
 Thomas Finneran, 1989–1995
 James T. Brett, 1995–1996
 Marty Walsh, April 12, 1997 – January 3, 2014
 Daniel J. Hunt, 2014-current

Previous locales
The district formerly covered:
 Chelsea, circa 1872 
 North Chelsea, circa 1872 
 Winthrop, circa 1872

See also
 List of Massachusetts House of Representatives elections
 Other Suffolk County districts of the Massachusetts House of Representatives: 1st, 2nd, 3rd, 4th, 5th, 6th, 7th, 8th, 9th, 10th, 11th, 12th, 14th, 15th, 16th, 17th, 18th, 19th
 List of Massachusetts General Courts
 List of former districts of the Massachusetts House of Representatives

Images
Portraits of legislators

References

External links
 Ballotpedia
  (State House district information based on U.S. Census Bureau's American Community Survey).
 League of Women Voters of Boston

House
Government of Suffolk County, Massachusetts
Government of Norfolk County, Massachusetts